Spohr is a German surname. Notable people with the surname include:

 Arnold Spohr (1923–2010), Canadian ballet dancer, choreographer, and artistic director of German descent
 Barbara Spohr (1955–1987), Canadian photographer
 Eduardo Spohr (born 1976), Brazilian fantasy and science fiction writer 
 Louis Spohr (1784–1859), German composer, violinist, and conductor
 Max Spohr (1850–1905), German bookseller and publisher